The 1888 Alabama gubernatorial election took place on August 6, 1888, in order to elect the governor of Alabama. Incumbent Democrat Thomas Seay ran for reelection to a second term.

Results

References

1888
gubernatorial
Alabama
August 1888 events